Eunomian is an eponymous adjective that may refer to:

Eunomia (goddess), a minor Greek goddess of law and legislation
Eunomius of Cyzicus (died c. 393), one of the leaders of the extreme or "anomoean" Arians
Eumonians, the followers of Eunomius (see Anomoeanism)
The Eunomia family, a large grouping of S-type asteroids named after the Greek goddess Eunomia